Mohammad Taqi Amoli (18871971) was an  Iranian  Shia jurist, philosopher and mystic.

Early life
Ayatollah Sheikh Mohammad Taqi Amoli (1887–1971) was born in Tehran. His father was Mulla Muhammad Amoli. They were the relatives of Hakim Mirza Abul-Hasan Jelveh. Muhammad Taqi Amoli was really one of the contemporary great scholars. He also has been a prominent student of Allameh Ali Tabatabaei who was known as Qazi. He taught and led the mosque of Majd ed-Dowleh.

Teachers
 Ali Tabatabaei
 Agha Zia Addin Araghi
 Muhammad Hossein Naini
 Abu l-Hasan al-Isfahani
 Abdolhosein Hezarjaribi
 Reza Nouri Mazandarani
 Ali Nouri
 Mirza Hassan kermanshahi
 Abdul Nabi Nouri
 Mohammad Hadi Taleghani

Students 
 Abdollah Javadi-Amoli
 Mahmoud Taleghani
 Hassan Hassanzadeh Amoli
 Razi Shirazi
 Mehdi Mohaghegh
 Mohammad Sadeqi Tehrani
 Mohammed Emami-Kashani
 Abdoldjavad Falaturi
 Sayyed Hassan Saadat Mostafavi
 Yahya Abedi
 Mustafa Masjed Jameie
 Mohammad Taqi Shariatmadari
 Reza Isfahani

Works 
Many books in different subjects such as philosophy, jurisprudence and theology were written by Ayatollah Sheikh Muhammad Taqi. Some of them are as below:
Notes on Faraed of Sheikh Ansary, explaining the poems of Hikmate Sabzevari, explaining the phrase of "there is no God but Allah"
Notes on Sharhe Matale in Logic
Notes On Sharhe Shamsiah, A Treaty on Praying and Islamic Judgments
Notes On Asfar (Al-Hikma al-muta‘aliya fi-l-asfar al-‘aqliyya al-arba‘a by Mulla Sadra)
Notes On Admonitions and The valuable collection of  Mesbah Al Hedayah in 12 vol as a commentary on Orvatol Vosqa.

Death 
He died in 1971 in Tehran and the shrine of Ali al-Ridha tomb in the garden of Ridvan Sabzevar (son of Mirza Musa Mirza Hossein  Sabzevari) buried.

bibliography
 Islamic Great encyclopedia,vol.2.pub:the center of Islamic great Encyclopedia, 1367 solar.

References

Aqa Bozorg Tehrani, Tabaqate Aalame Shiah, vol.1
Motaza Motahhari, Mutual services of Islam And Iran, Tehran, vol.2.1975

External links

Muhammad Taqi Amoli - Center for the Great Islamic Encyclopedia

1887 births
1971 deaths
People from Amol
Iranian jurists
Iranian Shia clerics
20th-century Iranian philosophers